The Invisible Man is a 1929–1932 surrealist oil on canvas by Salvador Dalí, now in the Museo Reina Sofía in Madrid. It is an experimental work, drawing on ancient Egyptian art and the work of Giuseppe Arcimboldo.

References

1932 paintings
Paintings by Salvador Dalí
Paintings in the collection of the Museo Nacional Centro de Arte Reina Sofía